The Netherlands has participated in every edition of the Junior Eurovision Song Contest since its inception in . Dutch broadcaster AVROTROS (formerly AVRO) has been responsible for the participation, selecting the nation's entrant through the national final Junior Songfestival. The Netherlands is the only country to have taken part in every edition of the contest.

History
The Netherlands are one of the sixteen countries to have made their debut at the inaugural Junior Eurovision Song Contest 2003, which took place on 15 November 2003 at the Forum in Copenhagen, Denmark.

The broadcaster AVROTROS, formerly AVRO, is responsible for the organisation of the Dutch Junior Eurovision Song Contest entry. A national final has been organised by AVRO to select the entry, called Junior Songfestival. Entrants previously wrote their own songs and sent it to the broadcaster, where a jury and the public decided the winner. Since 2016, candidates audition individually and are placed in groups later on.

This was the Netherlands' fifth victory at any Eurovision event, the last time being the Eurovision Song Contest 1975.

The  was held in the Netherlands, in the venue Ahoy in Rotterdam. The  was held in the Netherlands as well, this time in Amsterdam, making it the first country to host the Junior Eurovision Song Contest twice.

Participation overview

Commentators and spokespersons

The contests are broadcast online worldwide through the official Junior Eurovision Song Contest website junioreurovision.tv and YouTube. In 2015, the online broadcasts featured commentary in English by junioreurovision.tv editor Luke Fisher and 2011 Bulgarian Junior Eurovision Song Contest entrant Ivan Ivanov. The Dutch broadcaster, AVROTROS, sent their own commentator to each contest in order to provide commentary in the Dutch language. Spokespersons were also chosen by the national broadcaster in order to announce the awarding points from Netherlands. The table below list the details of each commentator and spokesperson since 2003.

Hostings

See also
Junior Songfestival – The competition organised by AVROTROS to select the entrant for the Junior Eurovision Song Contest.
Netherlands in the Eurovision Dance Contest – Dance version of the Eurovision Song Contest.
Netherlands in the Eurovision Song Contest – Senior version of the Junior Eurovision Song Contest.
Netherlands in the Eurovision Young Dancers – A competition organised by the EBU for younger dancers aged between 16 and 21.
Netherlands in the Eurovision Young Musicians – A competition organised by the EBU for musicians aged 18 years and younger.

Notes

References

 
Netherlands